Serhiy Chebotaryev (born 26 March 1991 in Dnipropetrovsk, Ukrainian SSR) is a professional Ukrainian football defender who plays for Finnish club Korsnäs FF.

Career
Chebotaryev is a product of FC Dnipro Youth Sportive School. His first trainers were Volodymyr Stryzhevskyi and Volodymyr Knysh.

After playing for Ukrainian clubs in the different levels, with a short time in Moldova, in January 2016 he signed a contract with Georgian club FC Zugdidi from the Umaglesi Liga.

In August 2018, Chebotaryev joined FK Dnipro 1918. In February 2019, he signed a deal with Veres Rivne. However, a few days later, his contract was terminated, because the club had found out that Chebotaryev had played in the Crimean Premier League in 2016.

In May 2019, Chebotaryov moved to Finnish club Korsnäs FF.

References

External links
Profile at FFU Official Site (Ukr)

1991 births
Living people
Ukrainian footballers
Ukrainian expatriate footballers
FC Naftovyk-Ukrnafta Okhtyrka players
FC Dynamo Khmelnytskyi players
FC Cherkashchyna players
FC Hirnyk Kryvyi Rih players
FC Iskra-Stal players
FC Zugdidi players
FC Bukovyna Chernivtsi players
FK Khujand players
NK Veres Rivne players
FC Peremoha Dnipro players
Ukrainian expatriate sportspeople in Moldova
Ukrainian expatriate sportspeople in Georgia (country)
Ukrainian expatriate sportspeople in Tajikistan
Ukrainian expatriate sportspeople in Finland
Expatriate footballers in Tajikistan
Expatriate footballers in Georgia (country)
Expatriate footballers in Finland
Association football defenders
Footballers from Dnipro